Cucullanus variolae is a species of parasitic nematodes. It is an endoparasite of the fish species Variola louti (type-host) and Variola albimarginata. The species has been described in 2020 by František Moravec & Jean-Lou Justine from material collected off New Caledonia in the South Pacific Ocean.

References 

Ascaridida
Parasitic nematodes of fish
Nematodes described in 2020
Fauna of New Caledonia
Endoparasites